Owais Ahmed Ghani, a mechanical engineer by profession, is the former governor of the Khyber Pakhtunkhwa province of Pakistan, who previously governed southwestern province of Balochistan for four and a half years.

He became active in politics in 1996 being one of the founding members of Pakistan Tehreek-e-Insaf led by cricketing hero Imran Khan. Following the party's rout in the 1997 general elections he subsequently left the party in protest against the joining of several controversial figures into the party. In 1999, he joined the Khyber-Pakhtunkhwa provincial cabinet serving as provincial minister for Industry from 1999 to 2002,

He was in 2002 appointed as Federal Minister for environment following the resignation of Omer Asghar Khan. Following the 2002 general elections he was appointed Governor of Balochistan. His period as Balochistan governor was controversial, especially following the murder of Nawab Akbar Bugti and Baloch protests against Federal rule. Ghani admitted there were problems with the law and order situation and drugs in Quetta, the capital of Balochistan, due to instability in neighboring Afghanistan.

He became governor of Khyber-Pakhtunkhwa in January 2008 after the former governor, Ali Jan Aurakzai, stepped down. Ghani gained a reputation for being tough with militants during his tenure as governor of Balochistan,

He is the third man (the first being Rahimuddin Khan and the second being Miangul Aurangzeb) in the history of Pakistan to have held the governorship of two provinces.7

Family 
Belonging to the Kakar Pashtun tribe of Zhob, Baluchistan, Owais Ahmed Ghani is the nephew of Sardar Abdur Rab Nishtar, one of the renowned founding fathers of Pakistan, son of his brother Sardar Abdul Ghani who was a career Police Officer. He is cousin of General Abdul Waheed Kakar Ex-Chief of Army Staff of Pakistan. The martyred and highly celebrated Commandant of the Frontier Constabulary, Safwat Ghayur, was his first cousin.

Achievements

As Governor Khyber Pakhtunkhwa (January 2008 - February 2011)

 Design, implementation and execution of a comprehensive Counter-Insurgency Campaign against Tehrik-e-Taliban Pakistan (TTP) militants in Province of Khyber-Pakhtunkhwa & FATA involving close coordination between Political, Military & Administrative organs of government which achieved outstanding success within 30 months.
 Development & implementation of a Reformed Government Administration set-up in the northern districts of KPK based on Magistracy, Alternate Dispute Resolution (ADR) systems.  
 Conceiving & developing a social uplift development project TARUCCI (Tribal Areas Rural to Urban Centres Conversion Initiative) for bringing social change via Urbanisation by developing Urban Centres in core areas of FATA and successfully obtaining World Bank Funding for the project.

As Governor Baluchistan(August 2003 - January 2008)

Negotiated with Baluch Militancy Leadership & successfully launched special Parliamentary Committee in 2005 involving all political parties of Pakistan for dialogue & reconciliation.   (dialogue process was derailed in the last stages due to violent attacks by  diehard Baluch militant elements)
Designed & conducted an Amnesty Program for Baluch Insurgents in 2005-07 which succeeded in cessation of violence.
Conceived & successfully completed the following Education Sector projects:
 Women University in Quetta-Baluchistan
  Baluchistan University for IT, Management & Emerging Sciences in Quetta
  Lasbela University of Agriculture, Water & Marine Sciences in Baluchistan     
 University of Science & Technology in Khuzdar-Balochistan
3 Cadet Colleges at Killa Saifullah, Pishin & Jafarabad
 Al-Hijra School & College at Ziarat; a public-private partnership for a Multi-Lingual System of Education
English, Urdu, Arabic) for students from low income groups only with free tuition, boarding & lodging from 7th to 12th)
 22 million World Bank funded project for 600 Community Schools in remote rural areas implement in partnership with selected NGOs.
Chamalang Coal Mines & Social Uplift Project: a first ever type of self-contained & self-sustaining project involving:
 Reconciliation & Resolution of a 35-year-old tribal conflict over the coal deposits in which over 500 lives were lost in tribal infighting
 Settlement of appropriate shares in mining between the warring tribes to  promote joint ownership of the project
 Creation of a Reconciliation Fund raised by charge on the mined coal for  payment of compensation to the families of those killed in the 35 years of tribal conflict
Creation of a Perpetual Social Development Fund raised by a cess on the  mined coal for socio-economic development of the area of the two tribes  whereby the following have been achieved to date and more  development  work continues:
 100+ KM metalled road from the main highway to Chamalang valley
 100+ KM Electricity Transmission Line to Chamalang Valley
 Drinking Water Supply System for the area
 Construction of 3 nos: Housing Towns for Miners & their Families
 Elementary Schools for Boys & Girls
 Dispensaries & Hospital for Miners & Families
 Raising a 1500 tribal Police Force for ensuring security, law & order
Commercial/Shopping centres & Truck Parking Areas
Populating the remote Chamalang Valley with almost 150,000 souls involved in mining, trucking & related activities.

Books
Pakistan, 2013 : views on statecraft, politics and governance, Lahore : Sang-e-Meel Publications, 2013, 239 p.
Where the Hunting Eagles Soar, Rawalpindi : Brass Tacks Publishing, 2015, 90 p. English translation of selected poems from Allama Iqbal.
Constitutional Framework For An Islamic Welfare State In Pakistan, Rawalpindi : Brass Tacks Publishing, 2015, 173 p.

References

Living people
Pakistani mechanical engineers
Pashtun people
Governors of Khyber Pakhtunkhwa
Governors of Balochistan, Pakistan
Edwardes College alumni
Year of birth missing (living people)